Haranga (gong) is a hard rock/progressive rock band from Ulaanbaatar, Mongolia, established in 1989 as the first Mongolian hard rock group. It has been performing in Mongolia since the early 1990s. In 1997, the group recorded two CDs in Germany, sponsored by Daimler-Chrysler and Siemens Nixdorf.

History
In the 1990s, their "Shuuder tsetseg" and "Uguilen sanana" became hits. And title name of "Only in Mongolia" became a popular quote in everyday life of Mongolia. They participated in Mongolian National TV's New Year's program "Tsenkher Delgets".

Members
Lkhagvasuren Khatanbaatar: vocal, trumpet /1989 - to present/
Chuluunbat Tserendorj: bass, double-bass, vocal /1989 - to present/
Enkhmanlai Tsendsuren: lead guitar, vocal /1989 - to present/
Odsuren Yarinpil: rhythm guitar, vocal /1989 - to present/
Purevdash Nemekh: drums, percussion /1989 - to present/
Bulgan Hangal: keyboards, accordion /deceased/ /1991 - 1999/

Discography 
 Эрин зууны хөг (The Sound of the Century 1997)
 Best of Haranga (1997)
 Бодлын тэнгис (Bodlyn Tengis, The Ocean of Thought, Unplugged, 2000)
 Ертөнцийн өнгө (Color of the World, 2003)
 Special Edition Gold (2007)
Амьдрал-2 (Life-2)

References

External links
Haranga music samples
Mongolia Sings its Own Song

Hard rock musical groups
Mongolian rock music groups